The British Virgin Islands has a two-party system, which means that there are two dominant political parties, creating difficulty for anybody to achieve electoral success under the banner of any other party.  In none of the previous four elections has a candidate who was not standing for any party other than one of the two main parties won a seat (although one candidate has won running as an independent).  Prior to 1999 there were a number of multi-party elections with four or more parties contesting and three or more parties winning seats.

Active parties
There are four main parties active at present in the Territory, and between them they hold all of the seats in the legislature.  Two of them were formed in 2018, the other two are much older.

Defunct parties
Several parties have previously held seats in the British Virgin Islands legislature but are no longer current or active.

Unelected parties
A number of political parties have been formed but failed to win any seats.  Only one of these parties has ever contested more than a single election (one of the parties named the Concern Citizen Movement contested two general elections; an unrelated party also named the Concern Citizen Movement contested a third).

Electoral history of main parties
History of the political parties who have won at least one seat at a general election.

See also
 Lists of political parties

 
British Virgin Islands
Virgin Islands
Political parties